Kenyon is a village and former civil parish, now in the parish of Croft, in the Warrington district, in the ceremonial county of Cheshire, England. In 1931 the parish had a population of 259.

History
Kenyon was recorded as Kenien in 1212. Kenian in 1258 and Kenyan in 1259.
It was sparsely populated, in 1901 the population was 329.

Governance
Kenyon was a township within the historic borders of Lancashire in Winwick ecclesiastical parish and part of Lowton until the reign of Henry III. 
It became part of Leigh Poor Law Union. In 1866 Kenyon became a separate civil parish, in 1933 the civil parish was abolished and became part of Golborne parish and Urban District.
Golborne Urban District was dissolved in 1974 and its area divided, the Culcheth and Newchurch wards 
(south of the old Kenyon Junction station and Kenyon Hall) became part of Warrington District in  
Cheshire, the rest became part of the Metropolitan Borough of Wigan, in Greater Manchester.

Geography
The underlying rock is sandstone with clay soil.
The road between Culcheth and Lowton crossed the village. To the west of the village the Liverpool and Manchester Railway 
had a junction with the Bolton and Leigh Railway where Kenyon Junction station was built. The Great Central Railway's Manchester to Wigan line 
crossed the township.  Kenyon was a centre for brickmaking.

References

Villages in Cheshire
Former civil parishes in Cheshire
Warrington